The 2016 Africa Beach Soccer Cup of Nations, also known as the 2016 CAF Beach Soccer Championship, was a beach soccer tournament which took place in Lagos, Nigeria in December, to determine the best beach soccer nation in Africa and doubles as a qualification event for the 2017 FIFA Beach Soccer World Cup, with the two finalists progressing to the finals in the Bahamas. This was the first time that the tournament is held in Nigeria.

Qualification

The 2016 Africa Beach Soccer Cup of Nations qualifying rounds decide the participating teams of the final tournament.

Due to being just 14 teams in qualifying compared to 19 at the previous edition, there was only one round of qualifiers this year where seven teams emerged to join host Nigeria for the final tournament.

Qualification ties are played on a home-and-away, two-legged basis. If the sides are level on aggregate after the second leg, the away goals rule is applied, and if still level, the tie proceeds directly to a penalty shoot-out (no extra time is played).

Entrants

Matches
The first legs were scheduled for 26–28 August 2016, and the second legs were scheduled for 16–18 September 2016.

|}

Note: Uganda, Liberia and Sudan withdrew.

Qualified teams and draw
The following eight teams qualified for the final tournament.

 (hosts)

The draw for the final tournament of the competition took place on 24 September 2016, 16:00 UTC+2, at the CAF headquarters in Cairo, Egypt. The eight teams were drawn into two groups of four. For the draw, the hosts Nigeria are seeded in position A1 and the defending champions Madagascar were seeded in position B1. The remaining six teams were seeded based on their results in the 2015 CAF Beach Soccer Championship.

Group stage
Each team earns three points for a win in regulation time, two points for a win in extra time, one point for a win in a penalty shoot-out, and no points for a defeat. The top two teams from each group advance to the semi-finals.

All times are local, WAT (UTC+1).

Group A

Group B

Placement stage (5th–8th place)

Bracket (5th–8th place)
Libya withdrew from the placement stage due to administrative reasons.

Fifth place semi-finals

Seventh place match

Fifth place match

Knockout stage

Bracket (1st–4th place)

Semi-finals
Winners qualify for 2017 FIFA Beach Soccer World Cup.

Third place match

Final

Awards

Winners

Individual awards
The following awards were given at the conclusion of the tournament.

Final ranking

Qualified teams for FIFA Beach Soccer World Cup
The following two teams from CAF qualified for the 2017 FIFA Beach Soccer World Cup.

1 Bold indicates champion for that year. Italic indicates host for that year.

References

External links
Beach Soccer Africa Cup Of Nations 2016, CAFonline.com
CAF Beach Soccer Africa Cup of Nations Nigeria 2016  at Beachsoccer.com

Qualification CAF
2016
2016 in beach soccer
2016 in African football